Alexander Webster (25 November 1908 – 28 March 1964) was an Australian cricketer. He played three first-class matches for Western Australia in 1929/30.

See also
 List of Western Australia first-class cricketers

References

External links
 

1908 births
1964 deaths
Australian cricketers
Western Australia cricketers
Cricketers from Fremantle